Lucky Luke is an animated television series based on the comic book series of the same name created by a Belgian cartoonist Morris.

References

External links
 

Lucky Luke
Television series based on Belgian comics
1991 French television series debuts
1992 French television series endings
1990s Western (genre) television series
French children's animated action television series
French children's animated adventure television series
French-language television shows
1990s American animated television series
1990s French animated television series
Western (genre) animated television series